Helton is an unincorporated community in  Helton Township, Ashe County, North Carolina, United States, east of Sturgills. It lies at an elevation of 2,730 feet (832 m).

The Baptist Chapel Church and Cemetery was listed on the National Register of Historic Places in 1976.

Notable person
Monte Weaver, baseball pitcher during the 1930s

References

Unincorporated communities in Ashe County, North Carolina
Unincorporated communities in North Carolina